Never Never Love is the second album by musician Pop Levi (former Super Numeri member, Ladytron bassist and remixer), released on 14 July 2008.

Track listing
'Wannamama'
'Never Never Love'
'Dita Dimoné'
'Semi-Babe'
'Fire On Your Feet'
'Mai's Space'
'You Don't Gotta Run'
'Oh God'
'Everything & Finally'
'Love You Straight'
'Call The Operator'
'Calling Me Down'
'Fountain Of Lies'

Singles
"Never Never Love" (28 April 2008)
"Dita Dimoné" (23 June 2008)

External links
Pop Levi's official MySpace website

2008 albums
Pop Levi albums